Saxonburg Historic District is a national historic district located at Saxonburg, Butler County, Pennsylvania. The district includes 54 contributing buildings and 2 contributing objects in the central business district and surrounding residential area of Saxonburg. It includes residential, commercial, and institutional buildings built between 1831 and 1952 in a number of popular architectural styles including Greek Revival and Gothic Revival.  The original town was laid out in 1831 by noted civil engineer John A. Roebling.  Notable buildings include the Helmbold House, Hotel Saxonburg, Kuntz-Steubgen House, Maurhoff Building, Kornfelder Building, St. Luke's Lutheran Church, and the Memorial United Presbyterian Church.  Located in the district and listed separately is the John Roebling House.

It was listed on the National Register of Historic Places in 1976.

Approximately 70% of the resources in the district pre-date 1900, 20% of the resources were constructed between 1900 and 1930, and the remaining 10% post-date 1930. Approximately eighty percent of the buildings are of a residential character; the balance are of a commercial or institutional character.

References

http://www.livingplaces.com/PA/Butler_County/Saxonburg_Borough/Saxonburg_Historic_District.html

Historic districts on the National Register of Historic Places in Pennsylvania
Greek Revival architecture in Pennsylvania
Gothic Revival architecture in Pennsylvania
Buildings and structures in Butler County, Pennsylvania
National Register of Historic Places in Butler County, Pennsylvania